The following is a list of justice ministers of Haiti.

List 

 8 April 1811 - : Jean-Baptiste Juge, comte de Terre-Neuve
 12 October 1816 - 10 March 1819: André Dominique Sabourin
 6 May 1819 - 20 February 1827: Jacques Ignace Fresnel
 20 February 1827 - 7 January 1844: Jean-Auguste Voltaire
 7 January 1844 - 18 February 1845: Honoré Féry
 18 February 1845 - 2 March 1846: Beaubrun Ardouin
 2 March 1846 - 27 July 1847: Alphonse Larochel
 27 July 1847 - 30 September 1847: Joseph François
 30 September 1947 - 9 April 1848: Damien Delva
 9 April 1848 - 14 February 1851: Jean-Baptiste Francisque, duc de Limbé
 14 February 1851 - 15 January 1859: Lysius Salomon, duc de Saint-Louis-du-Sud
 17 January 1859 - 24 March 1859: Jean-François Acloque
 24 March 1859 - 10 August 1861: Elie Dubois
 10 August 1861 - 6 January 1866: Valmé Lizaire
 6 January 1866 - 20 February 1866: Jean-Baptiste Damier
 20 February 1866 - 13 August 1866: Robert Deslandes
 13 August 1866 - 7 March 1867: Dasny Labonté
 7 March 1867 - 13 March 1867: Linstant de Pradines
 21 March 1867 - 6 May 1867: Ultimo Lafontant
 8 May 1867 - 21 July 1867: Linstant de Pradines 
 21 July 1867 - 10 February 1868: André GerMayn
 10 February 1868 - 20 May 1868: Numa Rigaud
 20 May 1868 - 3 August 1868: Alexandre Florent
 3 August 1868 - 19 February 1869: Hilaire Jean-Pierre
 19 February 1869 - 6 September 1869: Charles Archin
 6 September 1869 - 23 March 1870: Dasny Labonté 
 23 March 1870 - 7 May 1870: Saint-Ilmond Blot
 7 May 1870 - 27 April 1871: Benomy Lallemand
 27 April 1871 - 29 June 1871: Thomas Madiou
 29 June 1871 - 31 December 1871: Désilus Lamour
 2 January 1872 - 15 June 1874: Octavius Rameau
 15 June 1874 - 24 April 1876: James Boco
 24 April 1876 - 17 July 1876: Thimogène Lafontant
 20 July 1876 - 25 November 1876: Sauveur Faubert
 25 November 1876 - 1 September 1878: Dalbémar Jean-Joseph
 1 September 1878 - 1 September 1879: Charles Archin 
 1 September 1879 - 3 October 1879: Adelson Douyon
 3 October 1879 - 3 November 1879: Numa Rigaud 
 3 November 1879 - 23 January 1880: Thimogène Lafontant 
 23 January 1880 - 26 August 1881: Charles Archin (3rd time)
 26 August 1881 - 31 December 1881: François Denys Légitime
 31 December 1881 - 20 August 1883: Thomas Madiou 
 20 August 1883 - 14 March 1884: Ovide Cameau
 14 March 1884 - 16 February 1886: Innocent Michel Pierre
 16 February 1886 - 9 July 1886: Lélio Dominique
 9 July 1886 - 23 January 1888: Hugon Lechaud
 23 January 1888 - 10 August 1888: Jean-Chrisostome Arteaud
 1 September 1888 - : Etienne Erystale Claude
 19 December 1888 - 25 April 1889: Eugène Margron
 25 April 1889 - 31 May 1889: Solon Ménos
 31 May 1889 - 20 June 1889: Alix Rossignol
 20 June 1889 - 28 October 1889: Maximilien Laforest
 28 October 1889 - 18 February 1890: Léger Cauvin
 18 February 1890 - 12 August 1890: Hugon Lechaud 
 12 August 1890 - 1 July 1891: Duverneau Trouillot
 1 July 1891 - 19 August 1891: Hugon Lechaud (3rd time)
 19 August 1891 - 11 August 1892: Charles Archin (4th time)
 11 August 1892 - 19 May 1894: Edmond Lespinasse
 19 May 1894 - 27 December 1894: Ultimo Saint-Amand
 27 December 1894 - 17 December 1896: Pourcely Faine
 17 December 1896 - 26 July 1897: Solon Ménos
 26 July 1897 - 15 December 1897: Aurélus Dyer
 15 December 1897 - 17 August 1899: Carméleau Antoine
 17 August 1899 - 9 November 1900: Luxembourg Cauvin
 9 November 1900 - 12 May 1902: Gédéus Gédéon
 20 May 1902 - 21 December 1902: Lalannes
 22 December 1902 - 4 April 1903: Ultimo Saint-Amand 
 4 April 1903 - 4 January 1905: J.J.F. Magny
 4 January 1905 - 20 July 1905: Emile Deslandes
 20 July 1905 - 6 December 1908: Thrasybule Laleau
 8 December 1908 - 19 December 1908: Murat Claude
 19 December 1908 - 14 July 1909: J.J.F. Magny 
 14 July 1909 - 20 July 1911: Jean-Chrisotome Arteaud
 20 July 1911 - 4 August 1911: Furcy Châtelain
 4 August 1911 - July 1913: Tertulien Guilbaud
 July 1913 - 1 October 1913: Etienne Mathon (a. i.)
 1 October 1913 - 8 February 1914: Edouard Latortue
 8 February 1914 - 10 May 1914: Jacques Nicolas Léger
 10 May 1914 - 11 November 1914: Enoch Désert
 11 November 1914 - 12 December 1914: Justin Joseph
 12 December 1914 - 9 March 1915: Louis Borno
 9 March 1915 - 14 May 1915 Tertulien Guilbaud 
 14 May 1915 - 14 August 1915: David Jeannot
 14 August 1915 - 17 April 1917: Etienne Dornéval
 17 April 1917 - 3 July 1917: Furcy Châtelain 
 3 July 1917 - 20 June 1918: Edmond Dupuy
 20 June 1918 - 30 September 1918: Ernest Laporte
 30 September 1918 - 17 October 1919: Constantin Benoit
 17 October 1919 - 15 May 1922: Justin Barau
 15 May 1922 - 27 September 1923: Arthur Rameau
 27 September 1923 - 20 October 1924: Luc Dominique
 20 October 1924 - 21 August 1925: Delabarre Pierre-Louis
 21 August 1925 - 20 April 1926: Thimothée Paret
 20 April 1926 - 15 November 1926: Emmanuel Cauvin
 15 November 1926 - 31 March 1928: Emmanuel Beauvoir
 31 March 1928 - 25 November 1929: Arthur Rameau 
 25 November 1929 - 4 March 1930: Charles Riboul
 4 March 1930 - 6 May 1930: Thimothée Paret 
 6 May 1930 - 15 May 1930: Louis Edouard Rousseau
 15 May 1930 - 19 August 1930: Ernest Douyon
 19 August 1930 - 22 November 1930: Emmanuel Volel
 22 November 1930 - 18 May 1931: Adhémar Auguste
 18 May 1931 - 6 October 1931: Thrasybule Laleau 
 6 October 1931 - 17 May 1932: Emmanuel Rampy
 17 May 1932 - 20 September 1933: Elie Lescot
 20 September 1933 - 10 October 1936: Joseph Titus
 10 October 1936 - 29 November 1937: Odilon Charles
 29 November 1937 - 15 September 1938: Joseph Nemours Pierre-Louis
 15 September 1938 - 5 January 1940: Luc Prophète
 5 January 1940 - 10 October 1940: Léon Alfred
 10 October 1940 - 7 April 1941: Amilcar Duval
 8 April 1941 - 15 May 1941: Christian Latortue
 15 May 1941 - 11 January 1946: Vély Thébaud
 12 January 1946 - 16 August 1946: Eugène Kerby
 19 August 1946 - 20 November 1948: Georges Honorat
 26 November 1948 - 6 May 1950: Louis Raymond
 6 May 1950 - 10 May 1950: Castel Démesmin
 12 May 1950 - 19 August 1950: Emile Saint-Lot
 19 August 1950 - 6 December 1950: Lélio Dalencourt
 6 December 1950 - 5 May 1951: Montferrier Pierre
 5 May 1951 - 29 February 1952: Félix Diambois
 29 February 1952 - 1 April 1953: Paracelse Pélissier
 1 April 1953 - 31 July 1954: Ducasse Jumelle
 31 July 1954 - 6 September 1955: Luc Prophète 
 6 September 1955 - 29 August 1956: Adelphin Telson
 29 August 1956 - 14 December 1956: Alphonse Racine
 14 December 1956 - 2 February 1957: Rodolphe Bareau
 9 February 1957 - 6 April 1957: Colbert Bonhomme
 6 April 1957 - 25 May 1957: Stuart Cambronne
 25 May 1957 - 10 June 1957: Seymour Lamothe
 10 June 1957 - 14 June 1957: Antony Ervilus
 14 June 1957 - 22 October 1957: André Fareau
 22 October 1957 - 16 December 1957: Théodore Nicoleau
 16 December 1957 - 17 June 1958: Emile Saint-Clair
 17 June 1958 - 4 November 1958: Jean Bélizaire
 4 November 1958 - 21 September 1959: Lucien Bélizaire
 21 September 1959 - 19 December 1959: (Poste vacant)
 19 December 1959 - 30 May 1961: Luc François
 30 May 1961 - 18 January 1963: Simon Desvarieux
 18 January 1963 - 9 December 1963: Antoine Marthold
 9 December 1963 - 22 May 1967: Rameau Estimé
 22 May 1967 - 25 November 1968: Simon Desvarieux 
 25 November 1968 - : Rameau Estimé 
 22 April 1970 - 19 October 1970: Simon Desvarieux (3rd time)
 19 October 1970 - 15 November 1972: Jean-André Rousseau
 15 November 1972 - 20 March 1974: Fournier Fortuné
 23 March 1974 - 27 May 1977: Aurélien Jeanty
 27 May 1977 - 3 November 1978: Michel Fièvre
 3 November 1978 - 23 April 1980: Ewald Alexis
 23 April 1980 - 5 January 1981: Rock Raymond
 5 January 1981 - 3 February 1982: Rodrigue Casimir
 3 February 1982 - 12 July 1982: Dantès Colimon
 12 July 1982 - 29 December 1982: Bertholand Edouard
 29 December 1982 - 24 February 1984: Rodrigue Casimir 
 24 February 1984 - 3 October 1984: Jean Vandal
 3 October 1984 - 10 June 1985: Pierre Gonzales
 10 June 1985 - 30 December 1985: Théodore Achille
 30 December 1985 - 7 February 1986: Jean Vandal 
 7 February 1986 - 20 March 1986: Gérard Gourgue
 24 March 1986 - 5 January 1987: François Latortue
 5 January 1987 - 7 February 1988: François Saint-Fleur
 12 February 1988 - 20 June 1988: Martial Célestin
 20 June 1988 - 18 September 1988: Fritz Antoine
 18 September 1988 - 16 February 1989: Gilbert Austin
 16 February 1989 - 16 March 1990: Augustin RoMayn Cème
 16 March 1990 - 19 February 1991: Pierre Labissière
 19 February 1991 - 17 May 1991: Bayard Vincent
 17 May 1991 - 30 September 1991: Karl Auguste
 15 October 1991 - 14 April 1992: Antoine Leconte
 14 April 1992 - 19 June 1992: François Auguste
 19 June 1992 - 1 September 1993: Moyse Sénatus
 1 September 1993 - 14 October 1993: François Guy Malary
 14 October 1993 - 16 May 1994: (Poste vacant)
 16 May 1994 - 8 November 1994: Luc Toussaint
 8 November 1994 - 24 January 1995: Ernest Mallebranche
 24 January 1995 - 7 November 1995: Jean-Joseph Exumé
 7 November 1995 - 6 March 1996: René Magloire
 6 March 1996 - 24 March 1999: Pierre-Max Antoine
 24 March 1999 - 2 March 2001: Camille Leblanc
 2 March 2001 - 18 March 2002: Gary Lissade
 18 March 2002 - 30 September 2002: Jean-Baptiste Brown
 30 September 2002 - 29 February 2004: Calixte Delatour
 17 March 2004 - 14 June 2005: Bernard Gousse
 23 June 2005 - 9 June 2006: Henri Marge Dorléans
 9 June 2006 - 5 September 2008: René Magloire 
 5 September 2008 - 10 November 2008: Michèle Pierre-Louis (f) (a. i.)
 10 November 2008 - 11 November 2009: Jean-Joseph Exumé 
 11 November 2009 - 27 June 2011: Paul Denis
 27 June 2011 - 18 October 2011: Jean-Max Bellerive (a. i.)
 19 October 2011 - 22 November 2011: Josué Pierre-Louis
 22 November 2011 - 12 December 2011: Garry Conille (a. i.)
 12 December 2011 - 8 May 2012: Michel Brunache
 8 May 2012 - 18 January 2015: Jean Renel Sanon
 18 January 2015 - 23 March 2016: Pierre-Richard Casimir
 23 March 2016 - 13 March 2017: Camille Edouard, Jr
 13 March 2017 - : Heidi Fortuné
 25 April 2018 - :  Jean Roudy Aly

References

Justice